Fedlim Geancach Ó Conchobair (Feidhlimidh Gheangcaigh mac Toirdhealbhaigh Óig Ó Conchobhair Donn) (died 1475) was an Irish monarch of the fifteenth century. He was one of the sons of Toirdhealbhach Óg Donn Ó Conchobair and King of Connacht from 1461–1475. Fedlim Geancach Ó Conchobair succeeded to the throne of the Connachta in 1461 after the death of Aedh mac Tairdelbach Óg Ó Conchobair. Fedlim was the last fully recognized monarch of The Kingdom of Connacht.

References

 Byrne, Francis John (2001), Irish Kings and High-Kings, Dublin: Four Courts Press, 
 Gaelic and Gaelised Ireland, Kenneth Nicols, 1972.

1474 deaths
People from County Roscommon
15th-century Irish monarchs
O'Conor dynasty
Year of birth unknown